Kevin Croke (born 4 July 1982) is an Irish rugby union player. He played club rugby for his university UCD and St Mary's College.

Croke has numerous representative honours including caps for Ireland at Under 19's, 21's, 7's, Club International and at Universities level where he captained the 2007 team. At provincial level he has represented Leinster at U-19 and U-21.

He captained UCD for the 2005/06 season in the All-Ireland League Division 1. He also captained the team which retained the colours in 2005 for the university.

Croke is considered a stalwart of university, club and amateur rugby in Ireland. At senior rugby he is a regular on the Irish Club International team, the Irish Universities team where he is often captain and has play in the 7's world cup for Ireland in Hong Kong.

Croke moved to St Mary's College in before the 2011/12 season where he competed in AIL division 1A.

References

External links
Profile at ucdrugby.com
Senior Squad at ucdrugby.com
Profile at munsterrugby.ie
Profile at irishrugby.ie
Article at herald.ie
Article at internationalrugbynews.co.uk.indyfeed.co.uk
Article at archives.tcm.ie/kildarenationalist

1982 births
Living people
Irish rugby union players
University College Dublin R.F.C. players
Ireland international rugby sevens players
St Mary's College RFC players
Rugby union players from Dublin (city)
Rugby union number eights